Allstedt-Kaltenborn was a Verwaltungsgemeinschaft ("collective municipality") in the Mansfeld-Südharz district, in Saxony-Anhalt, Germany. It was situated east of Sangerhausen. The seat of the Verwaltungsgemeinschaft was in Allstedt. It was disbanded on 1 January 2010.

The Verwaltungsgemeinschaft Allstedt-Kaltenborn consisted of the following municipalities:

Former Verwaltungsgemeinschaften in Saxony-Anhalt